Kaloyan Tsvetkov (born 21 October 1988) is a Bulgarian footballer who plays as a midfielder for Bdin Vidin.

References

External links

Living people
1988 births
Bulgarian footballers
Association football midfielders
FC Botev Vratsa players
PFC Svetkavitsa players
FC Oborishte players
First Professional Football League (Bulgaria) players